Shushkovka, Ukraine, is the site of an ancient mega-settlement dating to 4000 BC belonging to the Cucuteni-Trypillian culture. The settlement was very large for the time. This proto-city is just one of 2440 Cucuteni–Trypillia settlements discovered so far in Moldova and Ukraine. Some 194 (8%) of these settlements had an area of more than 10 hectares between 5000–2700 BC and more than 29 settlements had an area in the range 100–450 hectares.

See also
 Cucuteni-Trypillian culture
 Danube Valley cultures

References

Cucuteni–Trypillia culture